Acrotemnus is an extinct genus of prehistoric ray-finned fish that lived during the Late Cretaceous epoch.The genus has single species Acrotemnus faba.

See also

 Prehistoric fish
 List of prehistoric bony fish

References

Late Cretaceous fish
Pycnodontiformes genera
Prehistoric fish of Africa